Sébikhotane is a town in the Dakar Region of western Senegal. It is in the Rufisque Department. The population in 2013 was 27,402.

Sébikotane is located 45 km east of Dakar. The village was founded by Sébikotane Sereres in 1736. A Catholic seminary was founded in 1911. It was the seat of a rural community from 1984 to 1996. The town received commune status in 1996. The population is mainly composed of farmers and farm workers.

History
During the Holocaust, some Jews in Senegal were taken by the colonial Vichy administration to an interment camp in Sébikhotane for forced labor. The location of the interment camp has been located, but the functions of the buildings have not yet been identified. 2 Jewish refugees who had escaped Europe were captured in Dakar and temporarily taken to the Sébikhotane internment camp and then transferred to the Office du Niger, a large cotton farm in Mali where the French colonial authorities used slave labor.

References

Communes of Senegal
Jews and Judaism in Senegal
Populated places in Dakar Region
The Holocaust in Africa